Danrlei de Deus Hinterholz, or just Danrlei (born 18 April 1973 in Crissiumal) is a retired Brazilian footballer who played as a goalkeeper.

He made his debut for the Brazil national team against Honduras in March 1995, and played three additional games during the run-up to the 1996 Olympic Games. He did not appear in any Olympic matches. He won many titles with Grêmio, most notably the Copa Libertadores in 1995.

Danrlei was injured on 16 January 2009 after the bus in which he was a passenger plunged off a 130-foot ravine while travelling back from a game.

References

External links
 

1973 births
Sportspeople from Rio Grande do Sul
Living people
Brazilian footballers
Brazil international footballers
Association football goalkeepers
Footballers at the 1996 Summer Olympics
Clube Atlético Mineiro players
Fluminense FC players
Grêmio Foot-Ball Porto Alegrense players
Clube do Remo players
Grêmio Esportivo Brasil players
Olympic bronze medalists for Brazil
Olympic footballers of Brazil
Brazilian people of German descent
Olympic medalists in football
Medalists at the 1996 Summer Olympics
1996 CONCACAF Gold Cup players